Jacksonia sternbergiana, commonly known as stinkwood or green stinkwood, is a species of shrub or small tree that occurs in the south-west of Western Australia.  It grows to between 1.5 and 5 metres high, has a weeping habit, and produces yellow and orange pea flowers in the summer. The Noongar peoples know the plant as kabbur, koorpa or mondurn.

This plant provides food for the larvae of several species of butterfly, including the turquoise jewel, fringed heath-blue, and long-tailed pea-blue.

References

Mirbelioids
Fabales of Australia
Rosids of Western Australia
sternbergiana